Kesselring is a German surname. Notable people with the surname include:

Albert Kesselring (1885–1960), German field marshal
Joseph Kesselring (1902–1967), American playwright

German-language surnames